Associação Cultural e Desportiva Potiguar, commonly known as Potiguar or as Potiguar de Mossoró, are a Brazilian football team from Mossoró. They won the Campeonato Potiguar once and competed in the Série A twice.

Potiguar is currently ranked fourth among Rio Grande do Norte teams in CBF's national club ranking at 157th place overall. They are the best placed team in the state from outside of Greater Natal.

History
They were founded on 11 February 1945, as Esporte Clube Potuguar by a group of sportsmen. They fused with Associação Desportiva Potiguar on June 19, 1953. The club won the Campeonato Potiguar in 2004. Potiguar competed in the Série A in 1979, when they were eliminated in the first stage. The club was eliminated in Copa João Havelange's first stage of the Green module in 2000.

Stadium

They play their home games at the Nogueirão stadium. The stadium has a maximum capacity of 25,000 people.

Honours
Campeonato Potiguar
 Winners (2): 2004, 2013
 Runners-up (3): 1997, 2006, 2008

Campeonato Potiguar Second Division
 Winners (1): 1981

Derby
The derby between Potiguar and Baraúnas is known as Potiba.

References

External links
 

Association football clubs established in 1945
Football clubs in Rio Grande do Norte